Edwards Pillar may refer to:

 Edwards Pillar, Antarctica
 Edward's Pillar, Sri Lanka